Alexander Elsden Martin (29 January 1895 – 28 October 1962) was a British sport shooter. He competed in the 1924 Summer Olympics, finishing ninth in the 600 metre free rifle competition.

His father is John Martin, who won a silver medal in shooting at the 1908 Olympics.

References

External links
 profile

1895 births
1962 deaths
British male sport shooters
ISSF rifle shooters
Olympic shooters of Great Britain
Shooters at the 1924 Summer Olympics